Bloodlust is a 1992 Australian vampire film directed by Jon Hewitt and Richard Wolstencroft and starring Big Bad Ralph and Kelly Chapman.

Premise
In the streets of Melbourne, three vampires wander around killing, having sex and taking drugs. They carry out a heist, which involves stealing $3 million which attracts the attention of many psychotics, who chase them through a blood spattered odyssey into the Melbourne underground.

Production
Co-director Jon Hewitt described it as:
A purpose-made, market-driven, crass, exploitation film. It isn't particularly good but, for me, it was really my film school. It's where I taught myself how to make a feature film and made a lot of mistakes on it - but I tried to learn from them. It was a film made in the context of not really being able to get any support for anything I was trying to do, then just going out and making something that I thought would have a back-end market, would be a safe bet, a sort of straight-to-video schlock film.
Filming took six weeks and was very difficult, with one member of the cast being arrested on drug charges. However Hewitt says it proved profitable.

References

External links

Bloodlust at Oz Movies

1990s erotic thriller films
1992 directorial debut films
1992 films
Australian erotic thriller films
1990s English-language films
Vampires in film
Films set in Melbourne
Lesbian-related films
Films directed by Jon Hewitt
1990s Australian films